Jim Donald Barnes is a former American football offensive guard. He played for the Arkansas Razorbacks and was selected as a consensus first-team All-American in 1968.

Football career
Barnes attended the University of Arkansas where he initially hoped to play at the end or linebacker position for the Razorbacks.  He ended up as a starter on the offensive line under head coach Frank Broyles.  He helped lead the 1968 Arkansas Razorbacks football team to a 10–1, a #6 rating in the AP Poll, and a victory over Georgia in the 1969 Sugar Bowl. Following the victory over favored Georgia in the Sugar Bowl, Barnes said: "I have never been associated with a bunch of boys like this. They've given up more and sacrificed more than any group I've ever seen."

Barnes was a consensus selection at the guard position on the 1968 College Football All-America Team, receiving first-team honors from the Associated Press and Central Press.  He was drafted by the Minnesota Vikings in the fifth round (106th overall pick) of the 1969 NFL Draft, but he did not play in the National Football League.

Barnes had polio in the third grade and was in bed for six-and-a-half months.  Barnes later recalled that his childhood struggle with polio gave him "an incentive to work a little harder."  When he was named to the All-American team in December 1968, the Associated Press story noted: "Jim Barnes looks more like an All-American than a polio victim."

References

Year of birth unknown
All-American college football players
American football offensive guards
Arkansas Razorbacks football players